The Subersach is a river of Vorarlberg, Austria, a triburay of the Bregenzer Ach.

Its course is strongly curved and resembles an arc. It merges with the Bregenzer Ach below Egg.

Rivers of Vorarlberg
Rivers of Austria